Wellington College Bog is a  biological Site of Special Scientific Interest in the grounds of Wellington College on the northern outskirts of Sandhurst in Berkshire.

The site features a valley bog, which is one of the richest in the county, in terms of bryophytes and flowering plants, containing several species which are uncommon or rare in southern Britain.

Fauna

The nature reserve has the following fauna:

Invertebrates

Bog bush cricket
Keeled skimmer

Flora

The site has the following Flora:

Trees

Betula pubescens
Salix cinerea
alder buckthorn
oak
silver birch
rowan
Scots pine

Plants

References

Sites of Special Scientific Interest in Berkshire